Siciliaria is a genus of small, air-breathing land snails, terrestrial pulmonate gastropod molluscs in the family Clausiliidae, all of which have a clausilium.

Species 
Species in the genus Siciliaria include:
Siciliaria calcarae (Philippi, 1844)
Siciliaria crassicostata (Pfeiffer, 1856)
Siciliaria eminens (Schmidt, 1868)
Siciliaria ernae Fauer, 1978
Siciliaria ferrox Brandt, 1961
Siciliaria gibbula (Rossmässler, 1836)
Siciliaria grohmanniana (Rossmässler, 1836)
Siciliaria incerta (Küster, 1861)
Siciliaria kobeltiana (Küster, 1876)
Siciliaria lamellata (Rossmässler, 1836)
Siciliaria leucophryna (Pfeiffer, 1862)
Siciliaria nobilis (Pfeiffer, 1848)
Siciliaria paestana (Philippi, 1836)
Siciliaria pantocratoris (Boettger, 1889)
Siciliaria riberothi Brandt, 1961
Siciliaria scarificata (Pfeiffer, 1856)
Siciliaria septemplicata (Philippi, 1836)
Siciliaria spezialensis Nordsieck, 1984
Siciliaria splendens Nordsieck, 1996
Siciliaria stigmatica (Rossmässler, 1836)
Siciliaria tiberii (Schmidt, 1868)
Siciliaria vulcanica (Benoit, 1860)

References

External links 

Clausiliidae